Kandiwal, also spelt Kandijwal, is a small Aboriginal community, located in the Kimberley region of Western Australia, within the Shire of Wyndham-East Kimberley.

Native title 
The community is located within the determined Uunguu (WAD6033/1999) native title claim area.

Governance 
The community is managed through its incorporated body, Kandiwal (Aboriginal Corporation), incorporated under the Aboriginal Councils and Associations Act 1976 on 30 April 1987.

Town planning 
Kandiwal Layout Plan No.1 has been prepared in accordance with State Planning Policy 3.2 Aboriginal Settlements. Layout Plan No.1 was endorsed by the community on 28 April 2010 and the Western Australian Planning Commission on 8 June 2010.

Notes

External links
 Office of the Registrar of Indigenous Corporations
 Native title claimant determination summary Part A and Part B.
Aboriginal communities in Kimberley (Western Australia)